Deurali may refer to several places in Nepal:

Deurali, Bagmati
Deurali, Dhawalagiri
Deurali, Gorkha
Deurali, Kaski
Deurali, Kosi
Deurali, Nawalparasi
Deurali, Palpa
Deurali, Ramechhap
Deurali, Tanahu
Deurali, Lamjung